Scopula spectrum is a moth of the family Geometridae. It is found in Uganda.

References

Endemic fauna of Uganda
Moths described in 1923
spectrum
Insects of Uganda
Moths of Africa